East Atadei, also known as South Lembata from its location, is a Central Malayo-Polynesian language of Indonesia spoken in the Atadei District of Lembata, an island east of Flores.

References

Flores-Lembata languages
Languages of Indonesia